Picrogama nigrisparsalis is a moth of the family Pyralidae first described by George Hampson in 1903. It is found in Sri Lanka.

References

Moths of Asia
Moths described in 1903